The Estrel Tower is a 176 m tall skyscraper under construction in the Neukölln district of Berlin, Germany. After its completion in 2024 the building will become Berlin's largest building and Germany's highest hotel.

History 
In 2013 the Estrel Hotel started a competition for the realization of a high-rise next to the existing hotel building located on the Sonnenallee. The competition was won by Barkow Leibinger (founded by Frank Barkow and Regine Leibinger) who proposed a series of triangulated volumes resembling the game of Tangram in response to the existing hotel building and the low-rise surrounding neighbourhoods. The proposal included a skyscraper with a sloped silhouette and a roof terrace oriented to the city.

In December 2017 the borough assembly of Neukölln gave its permission for the project.

The construction started in November 2021. The project aims to earn a LEED Gold certification.

See also 

 List of tallest buildings in Berlin

References

External links 

 Official website

Buildings and structures in Neukölln
Buildings and structures under construction in Germany
Skyscraper hotels
Skyscrapers in Berlin